Hong Kong is a 1952 American adventure film directed by Lewis R. Foster and written by Winston Miller. The film stars Ronald Reagan and Rhonda Fleming, and the lead supporting actors are Nigel Bruce, Marvin Miller, Mary Somerville and Lowell Gilmore. The film was released on January 12, 1952 by Paramount Pictures. It was rereleased in 1961 under the title Bombs Over China.

Plot

Jeff Williams is an American army veteran living in China who is on the run from the Red Army as the country falls to communism. Along the way, he encounters a Chinese orphan named Wei Lin who is carrying an ancient and valuable golden idol. Adventure ensues as Williams must outwit both the communists and Chinese gangsters while scheming to cash in on the idol himself.

Cast
Ronald Reagan as Jeff Williams
Rhonda Fleming as Victoria Evans
Nigel Bruce as Mr. Lighton
Marvin Miller as Tao Liang
Lady May Lawford as Mrs. Lighton
Lowell Gilmore as Danton
Claud Allister as Hotel Manager
Danny Chang as Wei Lin

Comic book adaptation
 Eastern Color Movie Love #13 (February 1952)

References

External links
 

1952 films
1952 adventure films
American adventure films
Cold War films
Films set in Hong Kong
Paramount Pictures films
Films directed by Lewis R. Foster
Films adapted into comics
1950s English-language films
1950s American films